Sky Dancers is the name of a line of toys and an animated show spin-off that were popular in the mid-1990s. The toys were constructed of a pull-string base and a doll with foam wings. When the doll was inserted into the base and the string pulled, the doll would launch into the air, spinning its wings like a propeller as it flew. The flight was like that of a helicopter.

Toys 
Initially Galoob launched the toys during the 1994 winter holiday season, and they proved to be successful.

The toys were re-released in 2005 with an adapted design, manufactured by Play Along Toys.  Galoob released a similar toyline aimed at boys called Dragon Flyz.

Recall 
While the foam wings on the dolls provided a limited amount of safety, nonetheless, there were over 100 injuries reported, ranging from temporary blindness to facial lacerations requiring stitches. Galoob, the manufacturer of the toys, recalled them in June 2000 after less than six years on the market.

Animated series 
In 1996, the toy series spawned an animated television spinoff produced by Gaumont Multimedia in association with Abrams Gentile Entertainment. The series premiered on France 2 on April 12, 1997. There were twenty-six episodes. The five characters were said to be students at the High Hope Dance Academy under the widowed Queen Skyla. Queen Skyla and her students defended her kingdom from Skyla's jealous brother-in-law Sky Clone, who sought revenge for his brother Skyler (Skyla's husband) being selected as king over him. Sky Clone had successfully killed Skyler but was unable to gain control of the Sky Swirl Stone that gave the Sky Dancers their powers.

Characters 

 Jade (voiced by Kerry O' Malley) – She is a prima ballerina at High Hope Dance Academy with the power to turn invisible in the Sky Realm. Jade gets along with all the Sky Dancers, but she argues with Slam a lot, who serves as potential romantic opposite at points throughout the series. They both like each other but are afraid to show their feelings. Though caring and compassionate, Jade can be stern, disapproving, and aggressive when she has a point to make. She is never one to avoid verbal confrontation, despite her powers leading her to more indirect physical confrontations. Jade has a close relationship with her father, a scientist who mostly raised her by himself. Their interactions highlight Jade's desire for black and white solutions. Jade's mother began teaching her to dance but the lessons ended when her mother decided to become a professional ballerina and left her family. Jade has long black hair, often in a ponytail, with an orange streak down the middle, and brown eyes. She wears a short fuchsia dress and white boots as a human. As a Sky Dancer, she has large fuchsia wings and her outfit is pink and white.
 Slam (voiced by James Michael) – He is High Hope Dance Academy's "Hero of Hip Hop" and controls the gravity beam in the Sky Realm. While lacking focus, interest, and patience for traditional dance class, he excels at break-dancing and hip hop. Slam has a large ego, reckless personality and can come across as a rebel. He is very competitive and hates ties, claiming that "the only thing a tie means is that I didn't win." He is also easily the bluntest of the group, often coming across as insensitive and lacking empathy. Deep down, Slam is fiercely loyal to his friends and always there when they need him the most. There are several episodes that suggest he has a crush on Jade, but his "tough guy" exterior holds him back. Even when he does approach Jade, it's a love/hate relationship, as they have two very different personalities and tastes in dance and music. Little is known about Slam's family or past. One episode hints that his finances are still directly tied to his mother's, and in another he indicates that he views himself as the one guy to make it big from his neighborhood. Slam has spiky red hair and black and yellow wings.
 Angelica (voiced by Andrea Burns) – High Hope Dance Academy's "Queen of Country Rock," she acts as leader of the Sky Dancers, with the power to briefly stop time. Angelica is very optimistic and witty, and tends to flirt with Breeze quite a bit, getting jealous when another high school girl in turn flirts with him. Angelica is a little spoiled by her parents and her love for pretty clothes and dancing late at night clubs gets her into trouble often. Her cardinal rules are, "Never miss a rehearsal, a dance step, or a jammin' party!" Angelica has blonde hair with pink streaks. She also wears a pair of pink heart earrings. Her outfits are white and blue.
 Camille (voiced by Donna Daley) – She is High Hope Dance Academy's "Modern Dance Aficionado," and can create any shape from clouds. Her parents, as lawyers, do not approve of Camille's dancing, and she doesn't have the heart to tell them that she wants to pursue it instead of following in their footsteps. In the group, she is the responsible and smart one who often stands as the voice of reason. Yet when left alone, she can be her own worst enemy. Though a stand-up person all-around, Camille can seem overly dramatic at times, due to how seriously she takes her relationships.  She is the most forgiving and generous member of the team, but not a pushover by any means. She is not afraid to stand up for herself or her friends. Camille has light, curly brown hair that she wears in a ponytail with a blue streak up the middle.
 Breeze (voiced by T.J. Benjamin) – He has a unique Native American Heritage dancing style, with the power of wind and nature, which is very effective against Sky Clone's minions. Breeze is more or less romantically connected to Angelica throughout the series, flirting with and complimenting her often. He is quiet, a bit shy, and mysterious, despite his rugged image.  Breeze is the most level-headed member of the group. He does not get into many disagreements, but when he does takes them very personally. Little is said of Breeze's family. His tribe seems to have some degree of reserve land for ceremonies, and Breeze mentions that his grandmother lives in Chicago. He also comments that he feels he was gifted with his late grandfather's wisdom. Breeze attended Lincoln High School and does a free performance for them during the series.
 Queen Skyla (voiced by Donna Daley) – Queen of the Sky Kingdom, she is also the dance headmistress of High Hope Dance Academy, where she is known as Dame Skyla. She is Skyler's wife and Sky Clone's sister-in-law. She wears a long green dress on earth, and a white and green gown in the Wingdom (a portmanteau of "wing" and "kingdom"). Her hair is blonde, and has pink and blue streaks in the Sky Realm. Skyla is notoriously timely, and one of her biggest pet peeves is when someone is not on time. Whirl and Twirl have been her pets since her childhood. She grew up in the palace with Skyler and Sky Clone, though it is unclear how she was connected with the royal family.  However, she is called "Princess Skyla" as a teen, suggesting that she is perhaps a ward to the royal family. She is often seen mourning her husband Skyler, who was supposedly killed by Sky Clone.
 Sky Clone (voiced by Johnathan Khan Davis) – Skyla's evil brother-in-law, Skyler's older brother and the main villain of the series. He is determined to take over the Sky Realm and defeat the Sky Dancers once and for all. He wants revenge against the Sky Realm because his brother Skyler took his right of flight, a fate he wishes on all of the sky citizens. He has tried multiple times to kill Skyla.
 King Skyler – Skyla's husband and Sky Clone's younger brother. He sacrificed himself by performing a death spin with Sky Clone in order to defeat him, but unfortunately did not actually kill him. It is revealed that Skyler is not dead, but trapped in another dimension. He is seen often in Skyla's flashbacks and frequently comes to her aid when she is in danger.
 Whirl and Twirl – They are Skyla's faithful canine companions, and can use their ears to fly while helping the Sky Dancers.
 Muddle, Jumble (voiced by Donna Daley) and Snarl (voiced by Thomas Cannizzaro) – Sky Clone's minions. The three imps offer comic relief throughout the series and often go head-to-head with Whirl and Twirl.
Caroline (voiced by Donna Daley) – A red-haired high school reporter, Caroline is dedicated to "getting the story." She meets Breeze at a school carnival and immediately becomes obsessed with him, leading to bad feelings between her and Angelica, Breeze's unofficial girlfriend. Caroline then proceeds to follow the Sky Dancers into the Sky Realm and gets on all their nerves, including the usually calm Skyla. She has an urge to interview everyone, and when she is kidnapped by Sky Clone, he gives her back just to get rid of her.
The Tinker – The Tinker is a friend of Queen Skyla's. As his name implies, he fixes things and is usually a great help to the Sky Dancers, providing them with information and his skills as a tinker. His constantly rhyming dialogue is a running joke in the series.
Brandon – Known by the girls as "Blowhard Brandon," he is another student at the High Hope Dance Academy and very full of himself. Jade, Camille, and Angelica fight over who should get stuck dancing with him. Later in the series, he plays mean pranks on the other students (particularly Angelica) and is paid to trick Slam into quitting the academy, which Slam figures out. Brandon is never seen after this, implying that he permanently left the High Hope Dance Academy.
King Skyhawk – The father of Sky Clone and Skyler and the former king of the Sky Realm. The Sky Dancers meet him when they travel back in time. He hires them as companions for Sky Clone, Skyler, and Skyla. Skyhawk is very kind and trusting, and the grown Skyler bears a strong resemblance to him. Skyhawk's wife and the reason for being a father figure to Skyla is never revealed.

Episodes

UK VHS releases

Other materials 
Sky Dancers also generated a children's book series in 1997. The stories were, for the most part, not tied to the animated series. The art style mimicked the toy line's aesthetics.

A board game was also generated and appears to be based on promotional material for or at least earlier drafts of the animated series. Some of the art in the theme song is close to the art and characters that appear on the board game.

In 2005 a Sky Dancers game was released for the Game Boy Advance, which used some of the names from the animated series.

References

External links
Sky Dancers – Galoob (Archive)
Sky Dancers Recall – Galoob (Archive)
CPSC, Galoob Toys Inc. Announce Recall of Sky Dancers Flying Dolls

Mass media franchises introduced in 1994
1990s toys
Xilam
1990s American animated television series
1996 American television series debuts
1996 American television series endings
1990s French animated television series
1996 French television series debuts
1996 French television series endings
American children's animated fantasy television series
French children's animated fantasy television series
Magical girl characters
Television series by CBS Studios
Toy recalls